Music for the Advancement of Hip Hop is a compilation album released by American hip hop record label Anticon in 1999. The album collects tracks by members of the label's core crew.

Critical reception
Dan Gizzi of AllMusic gave the album 4.5 stars out of 5, saying, "if you want to hear some abstract hip hop from a variety of different artists this may be the album for you." Jon Caramanica of Spin called it "the Anticon collective's breakthrough release". Ian S. Port of SF Weekly said: "It featured left-field DJ textures, boom-bap beats, insanely acrobatic rapping, and stilted, stumbling rhythms."

In 2015, Fact placed it at number 100 on the "100 Best Indie Hip-Hop Records of All Time" list.

Track listing

References

External links
 

1999 compilation albums
Anticon albums
Record label compilation albums